Jacques Ochs (18 February 1883 – 3 April 1971), was a Jewish Belgian artist and Olympic fencer in the  épée style (in which he was champion) and competed in the saber, and foil fencing categories.

Biography

Ochs was Jewish, and was born in Nice, France. His family moved to Liège, Belgium, in 1893. He was the Belgian Champion fencer in 1912 and competed for Belgium in the 1912 Stockholm Olympics, winning a gold medal in the team épée event (his teammates included Gaston Salmon). He also competed in three individual events at the same Olympics. In the individual foil and individual épée categories, he reached the 2nd round before being eliminated (he finished 39th in foil, and 29th in épée.) Ochs's final event was individual sabre, but he was eliminated in the 1st round.

Whilst pursuing a career as a professional fencer, he also worked at the newspapers "Newspaper of Liège", "Small Parisian", and "the Belgian Nation", drawing caricatures. His cartoons of personalities on the front page of the weekly Pourquoi Pas? between 1910 and 1971 made him very famous in Belgium.

During the Second World War, he was imprisoned on December 17 in the Fort Breendonk camp. .The Germans had a file against him containing, among other things, a caricature that appeared in an old Pourquoi Pas? newspaper and depicted a Hitler with bloody hands. He was detained in the Mechelen barracks and sentenced to death, but the German debacle saved his life.. The camp's prisoners suffered from starvation, grass eating, torture, hangings, and shootings. He survived imprisonment.

Ochs died in Liège in 1971, 88 years old.

See also
 List of select Jewish fencers

References

Bibliography

External links

 bio
 Holocaust through Art bio 
 Jews in Sports bio

Belgian male sabre fencers
Belgian male épée fencers
Belgian male foil fencers
Jewish male épée fencers
Jewish Belgian sportspeople
1971 deaths
Académie Julian alumni
Members of the Royal Academy of Belgium
Olympic fencers of Belgium
Fencers at the 1912 Summer Olympics
Olympic gold medalists for Belgium
Olympic medalists in fencing
Belgian caricaturists
Jewish caricaturists
Belgian military personnel of World War I
Breendonk prison camp survivors
1883 births
Medalists at the 1912 Summer Olympics
Sportspeople from Nice
Belgian Jews
Belgian people of French descent
20th-century Belgian painters
Jewish male foil fencers
Jewish male sabre fencers